Exumer is a German thrash metal band formed in Wiesbaden in 1985 by singer/bassist Mem V. Stein and guitarist Ray Mensh. The band broke up in 1991 after two demos and two albums. Exumer appeared for a one-off show at Wacken Open Air in 2001 and were reactivated by V. Stein and Mensh in 2008.

History 
Their first album, Possessed by Fire, is musically in the same vein as Into the Dark Past by the then-labelmates of Angel Dust. The second album Rising from the Sea is more influenced by Slayer due to the voice of Paul Arakaki, which is similar to that of Tom Araya. Soon after this album, the band broke up only to reform in the 2001 during the exhibition at Wacken Open Air. In 2009, Exumer released a one-track demo called "Waking the Fire". The band released their third album, Fire & Damnation, in April 2012, followed four years later by their fourth album, The Raging Tides. Their fifth album, Hostile Defiance, was released on 5 April 2019.

Band members 

Current members
 Mem V. Stein – vocals , bass 
 Ray Mensh – guitar 
 T. Schiavo – bass 
 Matthias Kassner – drums 
 Marc B – guitar 

Former members
 Bernie Siedler – guitar 
 Syke Bornetto – drums 
 Paul Arakaki – vocals, bass , guitar 
 John Cadden – vocals 
 Franz Pries – bass 
 Bernd Cramer – drums 
 J.P. Rapp – drums 
 H.K. – guitar 
 L.O.P. – drums

Discography

Studio albums 
 Possessed by Fire (1986)
 Rising from the Sea (1987)
 Fire & Damnation (2012)
 The Raging Tides (2016)
 Hostile Defiance (2019)

Demos 
 A Mortal in Black (1985)
 Whips & Chains (1989)
 Waking the Fire (2009)

References 

Sources

External links 

 
 
 

German thrash metal musical groups
Political music groups
Musical groups established in 1985
Musical groups disestablished in 1991
Metal Blade Records artists
1985 establishments in West Germany